Jeanne Ellen Pemberton is an American analytical chemist and Regents' Professor at the University of Arizona. Her research involves surface science and developing applications for glycolipids. In 1997, she was cofounder of the Committee on the Advancement of Women Chemists (COACh). She is an elected Fellow for several scientific societies, including the American Chemical Society and American Association for the Advancement of Science. She has leadership roles with the academic journals Annual Review of Analytical Chemistry and Analytical Chemistry.

Education
Pemberton attended the University of Delaware for her undergraduate, earning a Bachelor of Science in Biology and a Bachelor of Arts in Chemistry. She then attended the University of North Carolina, Chapel Hill, where she earned a PhD with an emphasis in analytical chemistry.

Career
Pemberton primarily researches surface science, using spectroscopic probes to explore interfacial chemistry. She also researches possible applications for glycolipids. She is co-founder of the company GlycoSurf, which researches the development of environmentally friendly glycolipid surfactants. Since 2005, she has been a Regents' Professor at the University of Arizona.

She has also been involved in initiatives to raise the profile of women in chemistry. In 1997 she cofounded the Committee on the Advancement of Women Chemists (COACh) along with Geraldine L. Richmond. COACh develops leadership and intellectual capacity among women in the sciences and engineering through professional development workshops.

Awards and honors
In 2009, she was elected as a Fellow of both the American Association for the Advancement of Science (AAAS) and the American Chemical Society.

She was co-editor of Annual Review of Analytical Chemistry from 2012-2021, and executive editor of Analytical Chemistry since 2019.

References

American women chemists
University of Arizona faculty
University of Delaware alumni
University of North Carolina at Chapel Hill alumni
Fellows of the American Association for the Advancement of Science
Fellows of the American Chemical Society
Year of birth missing (living people)
Living people
American women academics
Annual Reviews (publisher) editors
21st-century American women